The J. C. Braly House is a National Register of Historic Places-listed Colonial Revival-style house located in northwest Portland, Oregon.

History
The Braly family originated with James C. Braly and Mary E. Whistburn Braly, who were natives of Missouri. They settled in McMinnville, Oregon and moved to San Diego, California in 1886. The Bralys had six children: sons Clark, Addison, John Claude and James, Jr. and daughters Carrie Lee and Margaret Grace. James C. Braly died on July 29, 1902. It appears the senior J. C. Braly either served in or ran for the Oregon State Legislature in 1876. J. C. Braly, Jr. moved to Portland in 1911 and became a successful businessman. The house itself was built for the junior Braly in 1926 and added to the National Register of Historic Places in 1991.

See also
 National Register of Historic Places listings in Multnomah County, Oregon
 National Register of Historic Places listings in Northwest Portland, Oregon
 National Register of Historic Places listings in Oregon

References

Houses on the National Register of Historic Places in Oregon
National Register of Historic Places in Multnomah County, Oregon
1926 establishments in Oregon
Houses in Multnomah County, Oregon
Houses completed in 1926